Karur is a state assembly constituency in Karur district in Tamil Nadu. Its State Assembly Constituency number is 135. It comes under Karur Lok Sabha constituency. It is one of the 234 State Legislative Assembly Constituencies in Tamil Nadu, in India.

Demographics
Kongu Vellalar Gounder, Senguntha Mudaliar,Vettuva Gounder and Adi Dravida communities are numerically high in this constituency.

Madras State

Tamil Nadu

Election Results

2021

2016

2011

2006

2001

1996

1991

1989

1984

1980

1977

1971

1967

1962

1957

1952

References 

 

Assembly constituencies of Tamil Nadu
Karur district
Karur